Mitchell John Scott (born 3 February 1991) is a New Zealand rugby union player who currently plays as a wing for Otago in the New Zealand NPC competition.

Early life and family
Scott was born in Nelson in 1991, the son of former All Blacks halfback Stephen Scott, and was educated at Nelson College from 2002 to 2009.

Rugby union career

ITM Cup
Scott began his senior career in 2011 with his local team, the Tasman Makos. An impressive debut ITM Cup season saw him named in the  wider training group for the 2012 Super Rugby season, however injury hampered him throughout 2012 and he didn't make any Super Rugby or ITM Cup appearances that year. 2013 was much more successful for Scott as he scored 5 tries in 11 matches for the Makos to help them gain promotion to the ITM Cup Premiership Division. Despite this disappointment, Scott was signed to a Super Rugby contract by Australian franchise the Western Force ahead of the 2015 Super Rugby season.

International
Scott was a member of the New Zealand Under 20 side that won the 2011 IRB Junior World Championship in Italy.

References

1991 births
Living people
New Zealand rugby union players
Rugby union wings
Tasman rugby union players
Otago rugby union players
Rugby union players from Nelson, New Zealand
Expatriate rugby union players in Australia
New Zealand expatriates in Australia
People educated at Nelson College
Western Force players